Ana Lucia Araujo is an American historian, author, and professor of history at Howard University. She is a member of the International Scientific Committee of the UNESCO Slave Route Project. Her scholarship focuses on the transnational history, public memory, visual culture, and heritage of slavery and the Atlantic slave trade.

Early life 
Araujo was born and raised in Brazil. She earned her undergraduate degree in Fine Arts from Universidade Federal do Rio Grande do Sul (UFRGS), Porto Alegre, Brazil (1995), and a MA in history from Pontifícia Universidade Católica do Rio Grande do Sul (PUCRS), Porto Alegre, Brazil (1998). She moved to Canada in 1999 and obtained a PhD in Art History from Université Laval (Québec City, Canada) in 2004. Her main advisor was David Karel (1944-2007). In 2007 she also earned in cotutelle a PhD in history (Université Laval) and a doctorate in Social and Historical Anthropology from École des Hautes Études en Sciences Sociales (Paris, France). Her advisors were Africanist historian Bogumil Jewsiewicki and Africanist anthropologist .

Career 
Araujo received a postdoctoral fellowship from FQRSC (Fonds québécois de la recherche sur la société et la culture) in 2008, for the project titled: "Right to Image: Restitution of Cultural Heritage and Construction of the Memory of the Heirs of Slavery" but moved to Washington DC to take a tenure-track position of assistant professor in the Department of History at Howard University. She was tenured and promoted to associate professor in 2011, and became a full professor in 2014. She lectures throughout the United States, Canada, Brazil, Portugal, South Africa, France, United Kingdom, Netherlands, and Argentina, in English, French, Portuguese, and Spanish.

Honors and awards 
 2022 Getty Research Institute Senior Scholar, Los Angeles, CA 
 2022 Member of the School of Historical Studies, Institute for Advanced Study, Princeton, NJ
 2021 Fellow of the Royal Historical Society, London, UK
 2021 American Philosophical Society Franklin Research Grant
 2017–present Member of the International Scientific Committee of the UNESCO Slave Route Project

Research 

Araujo's work explores the public memory of slavery in the Atlantic world. Araujo's first book published in French, Romantisme tropical: l'aventure d'un peintre français au Brésil,  examines how French travelogues, especially the travel account of French artist François-Auguste Biard (1799-1882), Deux années au Brésil, contributed to constructing a particular image of Brazil in Europe.
   In 2015, the University of New Mexico Press published a revised translated version of this book Brazil Through French Eyes: A Nineteenth-Century Artist in the Tropics.

Araujo authored many books and articles on history and memory of slavery, including Public Memory of Slavery: Victims and Perpetrators in the Atlantic World (2010), Shadows of the Slave Past: Memory, Slavery, and Heritage (2014),Reparations for Slavery and the Slave Trade: A Transnational and Comparative History (2017), Slavery in the Age of Memory: Engaging the Past (2020), and Museums and Atlantic Slavery (2021). 

Public Memory of Slavery, Araujo's first book in English studies the historical connections between Bahia in Brazil and the Kingdom of Dahomey in modern Benin, during the era of the Atlantic slave trade and how in these two areas social actors are engaging in remembering and commemorating the slave past to forge particular identities through the construction of monuments, memorials, and museums. Echoing her research in Dahomey and the Atlantic slave trade, her comments on the movie The Woman King were featured in the Slate and the Washington Post. Araujo underscored that the movie misrepresented King Gezo (1818-1859) as attempting to end Dahomey's slave trade 

In her second book Shadows of the Slave Past (2014), Araujo continued to focus on the processes of memorialization of slavery and the Atlantic slave trade in the Americas, with a particular emphasis on Brazil and the United States, by focusing on the sites of embarkation in Africa such as the House of Slaves in Gorée Island, ports of disembarkation in the Americas such as Salvador and Rio de Janeiro in Brazil as well as Charleston and New York City in the United States, plantation heritage sites, the commemoration of the great emancipators Lincoln (United States) and Princess Isabel (Brazil), and the commemoration of slave rebels such as Zumbi, Chirino, and others in the Americas.

Her book Reparations for Slavery and the Slave Trade: A Transnational and Comparative History (2017) is a comprehensive history of the demands of financial and material reparations for slavery and the slave trade in the Atlantic world. The book emphasizes the long history of demands of reparations for slavery from the period of slavery to the present, by exploring these demands in countries such as the United States, Brazil, Cuba, and the Caribbean. By surveying the work of several activists and organizations such as Belinda Sutton, Queen Audley Moore, James Forman and the Black Manifesto, the Republic of New Africa and the rise of the Caribbean Ten Point Plan, Araujo insists on the central role of Black women in formulating demands of financial and material reparations for slavery.

In Slavery in the Age of Memory: Engaging the Past (2020) she discusses the controversy regarding the construction and removal of monuments commemorating slave owners and slave traders, and how slavery is represented in George Washington's Mount Vernon and Thomas Jefferson's Monticello. 
 
 Araujo often intervenes in the public debates discussing the removal of Confederate monuments in the United States, by arguing that their removal is not about erasing history, but about battles of public memory. She has also emphasized that the removal of monuments related to slavery is a global trend. Her work has addressed the removal of monuments and memorials during the worldwide protests which erupted after the murder of George Floyd on May 27, 2020.

A public scholar, Araujo's work has been featured in the New York Times, the Washington Post, Le Monde, Radio Canada, Radio France, National Geographic,O Público, and other media outlets around the world. Her op-eds have also appeared in the Washington Post, History News Network, Newsweek, Slate, Intercept Brasil.

Bibliography

Books 
  Museums and Atlantic Slavery. Oxon and New York: Routledge, 2021. 132 p. .
  Slavery in the Age of Memory: Engaging the Past. London and New York: Bloomsbury, 2020. 272 p. .
  Reparations for Slavery and the Slave Trade: A Transnational and Comparative History. London and New York: Bloomsbury, 2017. 288 p. .
  Romantismo tropical: Um pintor francês nos trópicos. São Paulo: Editora da Universidade de São Paulo, 2017. 248 p. 
  Brazil through the French Eyes: A Nineteenth-Century Artist in the Tropics. Albuquerque: University of New Mexico Press, 2015. 264 p. .
  African Heritage and Memories of Slavery in Brazil and the South Atlantic World. Amherst, NY: Cambria Press, 2015. 428 p.  .
  Shadows of the Slave Past: Memory, Heritage, and Slavery. New York: Routledge, 2014. 268 p. .
  Politics of Memory: Making Slavery Visible in the Public Space. New York: Routledge, 2012. 296 p.   
  Paths of the Atlantic Slave Trade: Interactions, Identities and Images. Amherst, NY: Cambria Press, 2011. 476 p.  
  Crossing Memories: Slavery and African Diaspora. Coedited with Mariana P. Candido, and Paul E. Lovejoy. Trenton, NJ: Africa World Press, 2011. 308 p. .
  Public Memory of Slavery: Victims and Perpetrators in the South Atlantic. Amherst, NY: Cambria Press, 2010. 502 p. .
  Living History: Encountering the Memory of the Heirs of Slavery. Newcastle, UK: Cambridge Scholars Publishing, 2009. 290 p. 
  Romantisme tropical: l'aventure illustrée d'un peintre français au Brésil. Quebec: Presses de l'Université Laval, 2008. 282 p. .

References

External links

Recorded lectures
Memory of Slavery and the Problem of Reparations in Brazil in "Brazil Initiative Lecture Series," Watson Institute, Brown University, Providence, RI, February 7, 2018. 
Reparations for Slavery and the Slave Trade: A Transnational and Comparative History. Book presentation at the School of Advanced International Studies, Johns Hopkins University, Washington DC, February 15.    
Sites of Disembarkation and the Public Memory of the Atlantic Slave Trade in " International conference The States of Memory of Slavery: International Comparative Perspectives. La mémoire de l'esclavage dans tous ses états. Perspectives internationales comparées," École des Hautes Études en Sciences Sociales, Paris, France, October 22–23, 2015 (video).
 Le corps de l’esclave: mémoires et patrimonies blessés (in French) at the International seminar «Éprouver le Brésil. Mémoires, marges et subversions», organized by CÉLAT (Université Laval) and the Harriet Tubman Institute (York University), held at Université Laval during the Black History Month, on February 26, 2015 (video).

1971 births
Living people
21st-century American historians
American women academics
21st-century Brazilian historians
Historians of Latin America
Historians of slavery
Howard University faculty
School for Advanced Studies in the Social Sciences alumni
Université Laval alumni
Brazilian expatriates in the United States
Brazilian American
American people of Brazilian descent